Edgell Bay is a bay  long and wide, indenting the northeast side of Nelson Island, in the South Shetland Islands. Spiro Hill overlooks the bay. This bay appears in rough outline on Powell's chart of the South Shetland Islands published in 1822. It was recharted during 1934–35 by Discovery Investigations personnel on the Discovery II, who named it for Vice Admiral Sir John Augustine Edgell, Royal Navy.

References 

Bays of Antarctica